Blood Is Thicker than Water may refer to:
 Blood is thicker than water, an English proverb

Film and television
 Bra Boys: Blood Is Thicker than Water, a 2007 Australian documentary
 "Blood Is Thicker than Water", a 2014 episode of Casualty
 "Blood Is Thicker than Water", a 2011 episode of Neighbourhood Watched

Music
 Blood Is Thicker than Water, a Huangmei opera in which Han Zaifen performed
 Blood Is Thicker than Water, a 1998 split album by Strength and Stinger
 "Blood Is Thicker than Water", a song by Black Label Society from Shot to Hell
 "Blood Is Thicker than Water", a 1983 song by Choirboys from Choirboys
 "Blood Is Thicker than Water", a 1974 song by William DeVaughn from Be Thankful for What You Got
 "Blood Is Thicker than Water", a 2014 song by Ill Niño from Till Death, La Familia
 "Blood Is Thicker than Water", a 1994 song by Impaled Nazarene from Suomi Finland Perkele
 "Blood Is Thicker than Water", a 2014 song by the McClymonts from Here's to You & I
 "Blood Is Thicker than Water", a 1992 song by Thelonious Monster from Beautiful Mess
 "Blood Is Thicker Than Water", a 2006 song by Pitbull featuring Redd Eyezz from El Mariel

See also
 Thicker than Water (disambiguation)